This is a list of all aircraft (fixed-wing and rotary-wing) obtained or operated by the Argentine Naval Aviation since its formation. For the current inventory please refer to the main article.

Fixed-wing aircraft

Rotary-wing aircraft

See also 

Argentine Naval Aviation
Argentine air forces in the Falklands War
List of aircraft of the Argentine Air Force
List of active aircraft of the Argentine Air Force
List of aircraft of the Argentine Army Aviation

References

Notes

Bibliography 
  Naval Aviation inventory 1912-80, at HISTARMAR
  Aircraft list, at Naval Aviation Institute
  Historia de la Aviación Naval Argentina Escuadrilla Aeronaval Antisubmarina (Antisubmarine Naval Squadron) PDF book

Online sources 
  Escuadrillas de Helicópteros Navales, Histarmar
  Transportes Navales, Histarmar

Further reading 
 
 
 
 
Aircraft specific bibliography

External links 
 Argentine Navy official site
 MUAN Official Naval Aviation Museum
 
 Argentine Navy videos from ARA Independencia and ARA 25 de Mayo aircraft carriers  

Naval Aviation
Argentine Naval Aviation
Argentine Naval Aviation